Edgar Vernon Barnhart (September 16, 1904 – September 14, 1984) was an American professional baseball pitcher. Barnhart played in one game for the St. Louis Browns on September 23, .

External links

1904 births
1984 deaths
St. Louis Browns players
Baseball players from Missouri
Baseball pitchers